Richard Farda (born November 8, 1945 in Brno, Czechoslovakia) is a retired professional ice hockey player who played in the Czechoslovak Extraliga and World Hockey Association.  He played for HC Brno, Toronto Toros, and Birmingham Bulls.  He won a bronze medal at the 1972 Winter Olympics.

External links

1945 births
Living people
Birmingham Bulls players
Czechoslovak defectors
Czech ice hockey centres
Czechoslovak ice hockey centres
Czech ice hockey coaches
Ice hockey players at the 1972 Winter Olympics
Olympic bronze medalists for Czechoslovakia
Olympic ice hockey players of Czechoslovakia
Olympic medalists in ice hockey
Ice hockey people from Brno
Toronto Toros players
Medalists at the 1972 Winter Olympics
HC Kometa Brno players
HC Dukla Jihlava players
Genève-Servette HC players
ZSC Lions players
GCK Lions players
Czechoslovak expatriate sportspeople in Canada
Czechoslovak expatriate sportspeople in Switzerland
Czech expatriate sportspeople in Switzerland
Czechoslovak expatriate ice hockey people
Czech expatriate ice hockey people
Expatriate ice hockey players in Canada
Expatriate ice hockey players in Switzerland